Landolphia dulcis is a climbing shrub or liana within the Apocynaceae family.

Description 
The species is capable of growing up to 5m tall as a sarmentose shrub and reach a height of 10m as a liana. Leaves, the glabrous or pilose petiole is 2-17 mm long; leaf-blade is ovate to obovate in outline, leaflets have a coriaceous surface, leaf apex is emarginate to acuminate while the base is cordate to cuneate. The inflorescence is axillary with 1-3 flower per axil, peduncle is 0.5-5.5 mm long, pedicels are 0.1-3.1 mm long. The flowers are fragrant, the calyx is green, brown or violet, 2-2.9 mm long with 4 or 5 unequal sepals. The corolla is often discolorous and is commonly dark green, yellow, violet, cream or reddish. Fruit is globular, 5-50 seeded, commonly green, orange, yellow or red turning blackish or reddish when cut.

Distribution 
Largely occurs in West Africa, from Senegal to Nigeria, also found in Central Africa, in particular, Gabon and Angola.

Chemistry 
Root of the species contains aromadendrene compounds, a group of sesquiterpenes.

Uses 
Leaf and stem bark extracts are part of a decoction used by herbalists in treating chronic sore, body pains and dysentery. Its fruit is edible and eaten by locals. Latex is sometimes used as birdlime.

References 

Flora of West Tropical Africa
Flora of Gabon
Rauvolfioideae